Bob Boden (born January 21, 1959) is an American television producer. He is known for his work on game shows and reality television and is the Executive Vice President of Production and Development for Byron Allen's company Entertainment Studios.

Shows he has developed, supervised and produced include Funny You Should Ask, Family Feud, The $25,000 Pyramid, Press Your Luck, Card Sharks, Home & Family, Family Game Night, The Game of Life, Scrabble Showdown, To Tell the Truth, Don't Forget the Lyrics, Match Game, Solitary, Penn & Teller's Sin City Spectacular, American Idol Extra, Househusbands of Hollywood, The Academy, Paradise Hotel 2, The FOX Reality Channel Really Awards, Lingo, Friend or Foe?, Whammy! The All-New Press Your Luck, Russian Roulette, Cram, Greed (which he co-created), and The Chase, which received a Daytime Emmy nomination.

Early life and education
Boden was born on January 21, 1959, in The Bronx, New York, the only child of Hannah and Kenneth Boden, who were both registered nurses. He grew up in Flushing, Queens, where he graduated from John Bowne High School and moved to Los Angeles, where he graduated from the University of California, Los Angeles in 1981 with a B.A. in Theater Arts. He also has a Master's Degree from California State University, Dominguez Hills in Negotiation, Conflict Resolution and Peacebuilding.

Career
Boden began his television work as a cue card associate for Barney McNulty, then as a production assistant on the game show Temptation. He then worked at Paramount Television in research. He joined CBS and was selected for the management training program, which resulted in a job as Program Executive in Daytime Programming. Here, he oversaw shows such as Press Your Luck, The $25,000 Pyramid, and Card Sharks. He left CBS to work as Director of Development for Barry & Enright Productions before moving to ABC as Director of Daytime Development. He later worked at Buena Vista Productions and as the Vice President of Development at Mark Goodson Productions. In 1994, he helped launch the Game Show Network and served as its programming chief between 2001-2003. In the late 1990s, he worked as Vice President of Daytime Programming for The Family Channel, where he supervised shows including Shop 'til You Drop, Home & Family, Shopping Spree, and It Takes Two. As Vice President of Development at FX, he oversaw Penn & Teller's Sin City Spectacular and Personal fX: The Collectibles Show. He has also held the titles of Senior Vice President of Product and Development for dick clark productions, as Senior Vice President of Programming for the Fox Reality Channel, and as Senior Vice President of Reality and Game Shows for Hasbro Studios.

In 1999, Boden co-created Greed for FOX with Dick Clark. He then served as its showrunner, executive producer, and writer. The show aired on FOX and was hosted by Chuck Woolery. He was also showrunner and executive producer for The Chase, an adaption of the British game show, on the Game Show Network. The Chase was nominated at the 41st Daytime Emmy Awards for the Daytime Emmy Award for Outstanding Game Show. James Holzhauer appeared on the show in 2014 and the show regained attention after Holzhauer's appearance on Jeopardy!. Boden was featured as a game show expert in several interviews.

In addition to his production work, he is an adjunct professor at Syracuse University. In 2022, he gave a TEDx talk at Syracuse.

Personal life
Boden serves as a governor for the Academy of Television Arts & Sciences' reality peer group. He and his wife Marla have a daughter, Rachel. He has another daughter, Micki, from a previous marriage.

Selected credits

References 

Living people
1959 births
Television producers from New York City